The Clickburg Webcomic Awards, generally referred to as the Clickies, were a Dutch webcomics awards ceremony held four times between 2005 and 2010. Created to promote webcomics in the Netherlands and Belgium, the Clickies were first awarded in 2005 at the world's first webcomic convention, Clickburg. The awards were again bestowed in 2006, 2007, and 2010, each time in a slightly different format.

History

The Clickburg Webcomic Awards were first awarded on May 1, 2005, at Clickburg, the world's first webcomic exhibition. The Clickburg foundation was set up by René van Densen, in collaboration with Jeroen Mirck, and Stephan Fellinger. The event was held at the Tilburg Hall of Fame and featured musical performances, workshops, and lectures. Around 43 webcartoonists were able to present their webcomics on large screens and through video projectors, and Clickburg featured a lecture by Evert Geradts. None of the three Clickies winners were present in Tilburg during Clickburg, so the organization delivered the trophies by car.

Jury chairman Jeroen Mirck noted during the event that webcartoonists were not utilizing the specific opportunities of the medium enough, saying "too many online strips are no more than strips lost on a screen."

The Clickburg Webcomic Awards were bestowed at Stripdagen Houten in 2007. The Clickburg foundation and its Web forum went quiet after this event. The Clickies returned for the fourth and final time in 2010, when they were again awarded as part of the Stripdagen Haarlem. This year, the jury consisted of comic shop owner Klaas Knol, journalist Natasja van Loon, cartoonist Jeroen Jager, writer Johan de Rooij, and new chairman Tom Hamoen.

Winners
As Clickburg's objective is to promote webcomics in the Netherlands, the Clickies were exclusively awarded to Dutch and Belgian cartoonists, with the exception of the 2006 international category. The Clickies featured several equal categories, such as the Epic Clickie for narrative-focused webcomics and the Humor Clickie for comedic webcomics.

Notes

See also

 List of European art awards

References

External links
 Official website, 2008 archive
 

Awards established in 2005
Dutch art awards
Webcomic awards
Web awards